Neita victoriae is a butterfly in the family Nymphalidae. It is found in Tanzania (the southern shores of Lake Victoria) and south-western Kenya. The habitat consists of Brachystegia woodland.

References

Satyrini
Butterflies described in 1899
Butterflies of Africa
Taxa named by Per Olof Christopher Aurivillius